The  Anastasian Wall Battle or Battle at the Anastasian Wall, which took place at the end of winter – beginning of the spring in 559, was a crucial combat between Byzantine army commanded by Dux Sergius and target to Constantinople detachment of the Kutrigur Bulgars armies commanded by Zabergan in the Kutrigurs large champagne against the Empire in 558-559 AD. The battle took place at the east side of the Anastasian Wall, about 40 km of Constantinople after Kutrigurs pass the Wall in their raid to the Empire capital.

Background 
During the winter of 558, a Kutrigur armies crossed the frozen Danube, invaded Moesia and Thrace and divided on 3 wings attack Constantinople direction, Thracian Chersonesus (Galipoli) and to Thermopylae in Greece.  Led by Zabergam divide for Constantinople direction detachment of 7000 cavalry, crosses the Anastasian wall at the end of winter – beginning of the spring in 559.

The Battle 
After the Kutrigur cavalry passed the Anastasian Wall, Emperor Justinian I the Great  sent against them The Imperial Guard, troops, and mobilized citizens. The Zabergan cavalry met the Byzantine army at the east side of the Anastasian Wall and defeated them. They captured and executed the commander of the Byzantine forces, Patricius Sergius.

Aftermath 
After this victory Zabergan forces in the beginning of the spring of 559 take the Constantinople suburb settlements Drypia, Nymphs (Nymphas) and Hitos (Chitus) standing about 15 km to the gate of St. Roman and reach Sykai (Galata), encircle and approach immediately to the gates of capital of the Empire. Zabergan made his fortified camp at Melantias, just 20 km of Constantinople, seized all the area to the Walls of Constantinople and pushed the survived Roman population to escape panicky behind the walls of the capital threatening Constantinople itself. After the Battle of Melantias win by Byzantian Zabergan forces march from Melantias go even more closer to Constantinople and take Dekaton (Decatum) – only 10 km from the Golden gate.

References 

550s in the Byzantine Empire
Melantias
550s conflicts
559
Kutrigurs
Justinian I